Doug Cooper (born September 9, 1938 in Gastonia, North Carolina - September 3, 1987) was a NASCAR driver who competed on the Grand National circuit for six seasons from 1963 to 1968. He is best known for winning the NASCAR Rookie of the Year award in 1964.

Racing career
Cooper made his Grand National debut in 1963 at South Boston Speedway, starting and finish in last place in the 22-car field after a head gasket failure on the opening lap. He came back the next race with a career-best 3rd-place finish at Occoneechee Speedway, a position in which he would finish on two more occasions in his Grand National career.

Cooper would have his best season in 1964, as he posted career highs in top fives (4), top tens (11), and average finish (16.4). He tied his career-best finish of 3rd place at Piedmont Interstate Fairgrounds that season. He ended that season ranked 21st in the standings after competing in 39 of 62 races and was named the NASCAR Rookie of the Year for 1964.

Cooper would compete regularly on the Grand National circuit for the next three seasons following his 1964 Rookie of the Year campaign, finishing a career high 19th in the standings in 1965. He would also compete in three NASCAR Modified races in 1965 and 1966, posting two top ten finishes, including a 5th-place finish at Daytona International Speedway.

Having competed for his own team for much of his career, Cooper ran eight races for two-time Grand National champion Buck Baker in 1967, posting a best finish of 8th place at Asheville-Weaverville Speedway. He would compete in just one race in 1968, driving for owner/driver Henley Gray at Bristol Motor Speedway, finishing in 27th place after a ball joint failure just 206 laps into the 500-lap event. He quietly retired from racing afterwards at age 29, having earned 11 top fives and 29 top tens in 113 career starts on the Grand National circuit.

Death
Cooper died on September 3, 1987, just six days shy of his 49th birthday.

References

External links
 
 The Third Turn Profile
 Ultimate Racing History Profile

Awards

1938 births
1987 deaths
NASCAR drivers
People from Gastonia, North Carolina
Racing drivers from North Carolina